Tell Me I'm Not Dreaming is a song by Welsh classical singer Katherine Jenkins, released as the first single from the platinum edition of her seventh studio album Believe, and sixth single from the album as a whole. The song had its world exclusive first play on Ken Bruce's BBC Radio 2 show on 19 October 2010 and was released in the UK on 29 November 2010. A music video was recorded and a clip of it was shown on the Graham Norton Show.

References

2010 singles
Songs written by David Hodges
Song recordings produced by John Shanks
Songs written by Steve McEwan
2010 songs